Kubbeh, also known as kubbe, is a family of dishes of Iraqi and Kurdish Jewish origin that are also popular in Syria,  and consist of a filled dumpling soup, with a wide array of fillings and soup broths. Once almost exclusively made at home by members of the Iraqi and Kurdish Jewish community, since the early 20th century the popularity of the dish has expanded to Israelis of all backgrounds and is commonly served in restaurants across the nation, most notably in the Machane Yehuda market in Jerusalem.

The term kubbeh is also used in some countries to refer to kibbeh, a type of paste made of bulgur and meat that is used in a variety of regional dishes.

Variations
 Kubbeh adom ("red kubbeh" in Hebrew), semolina dumplings in a broth made with beets and tomato paste
 Kubbeh hamusta ("sour kubbeh" in Kurdish), semolina dumplings in a tart broth made with lemon juice or citric acid
 Kubbeh noo’ah, sour kubbeh made with arum leaves
 Kubbeh hamu ("yellow kubbeh"), made with turmeric

See also
Jewish cuisine
Mizrahi Jewish cuisine
Kurdish cuisine

References

Israeli cuisine
Jewish cuisine
Mizrahi Jewish cuisine
Iraqi Jews
Jews and Judaism in Kurdistan
Dumplings
Soups
Kurdish cuisine
Iraqi cuisine
Semolina dishes
Beef dishes